Tony Joseph is an Indian journalist and former editor of Businessworld magazine. He is also the author of the best-selling book Early Indians: The Story of Our Ancestors and Where We Came From (2018). Until 2018, he was also the chairman and co-founder of Mindworks Global Media Services. He is based in New Delhi.  Joseph has been an editor and a journalist for over three decades and was, at various times, features editor of The Economic Times, associate editor of Business Standard and editor of Businessworld magazine (from 1998). His articles have appeared in Outlook India,  Quartz, Live Mint and The Hindu.

Early Indians is focused on four prehistoric migrations that shaped the demography of India, including the migrations after 2000 BC.

Joseph describes himself as an atheist.

Published works

References 

1963 births
Living people
Journalists from Delhi
Indian atheists